Living in the U.S.A. is a budget compilation package with songs by The Steve Miller Band, assembled by CEMA Special Markets and released in 1990. It features material from the band's 1968-1973 albums, and despite being only a budget release, it has been certified "gold" in the United States. An earlier version with this same title was a 1971 double budget reissue of their second album Sailor along with their first Children of the Future.

Track listing
"Living in the U.S.A." (Steve Miller) – 4:05
"Space Cowboy" (Miller, Ben Sidran) – 4:57
"Don't Let Nobody Turn You Around" (Miller) – 2:29
"The Joker" (Miller) – 4:26
"Gangster of Love" (Johnny Watson) – 1:25
"Lovin' Cup" (Miller) – 2:11
"Quicksilver Girl" (Miller) – 2:44
"Your Saving Grace" (Tim Davis) – 4:49
"Motherless Children" (Trad. arr. Miller) – 4:22
"Mary Lou" (Obie Jessie, Sam Ling) – 2:24

Track listing from Capitol Records Cassette 4XL-57288
"The Joker"
"Your Saving Grace"
"Living in the U.S.A."
"Lovin' Cup"
"Don't Let Nobody Turn You Around"
"Motherless Children"
"Gangster of Love"
"Space Cowboy"

Personnel
 Steve Miller – guitar, harmonica, vocals
 Boz Scaggs – guitar, vocals on tracks 1, 5 & 7
 Glyn Johns – guitar, percussion, vocals on track 2
 Lonnie Turner – bass guitar, vocals on tracks 1–3, 5, 7–9
 Gerald Johnson – bass guitar, vocals on tracks 4, 6 & 10
 Jim Peterman – keyboards, vocals on tracks 1, 5 & 7
 Ben Sidran – keyboards on tracks 2, 3, 8 & 9
 Dick Thompson – keyboards on tracks 4, 6 & 10
 Tim Davis – drums, vocals on tracks 1–3, 5, 7–9
 John King – drums on tracks 4, 6 & 10

Certifications

References

Steve Miller Band compilation albums
1990 compilation albums
Albums produced by Glyn Johns
Capitol Records compilation albums